Heads Hill is a hamlet on Crookham Common in the civil parish of Thatcham in the English county of Berkshire.

Goldfinch Bottom is to the north and the Greenham Business Park to the west. The latter was formed across the H.Q. area of the old Greenham Common Airbase. Most of Greenham and Crookham Commons formed the RAF Greenham Common Airfield, initially constructed in W.W.II, but was enlarged during the Cold War as the USAF atomic rocket bomb base.

Hamlets in Berkshire
West Berkshire District
Thatcham